Scott Rechler is an American businessman. He is CEO and Chairman of RXR Realty (NY). He is the former vice chairman of the Port Authority of New York and New Jersey and current chairman of the Regional Plan Association, and a member of the Metropolitan Transportation Authority board.

Career
Rechler was born to a Jewish family, the son of Lita (née Rudy) and Roger Rechler. He was raised in Port Washington, New York on Long Island. His grandfather, William Rechler, founded Reckson Associates in 1958. Scott Rechler joined the company in 1989 and led its initial public offering in 1995 forming Reckson Associates Realty Corp. (NYSE:RA). Rechler became chief operating officer and later co-CEO of the company and he led Reckson's expansion beyond Long Island into the New York and tri-state region. In 2003, Rechler was named chief executive. The company was acquired in early 2007 by SL Green Realty Corp. for $6 billion, which resulted in a 700 percent total return for Reckson shareholders. Afterwards, Rechler formed RXR Realty and became CEO and Chairman of the organization. By 2017, RXR managed over 22 million square feet of commercial real estate and held more than $15.7 billion in assets under management.

Rechler was appointed to the Port Authority of New York and New Jersey by Governor Andrew Cuomo in 2011, where he oversaw the redevelopment of LaGuardia Airport and the World Trade Center. He became vice-chairman of the organization in 2012. In May 2016, he left his position with the Port Authority. In October 2016, Rechler was elected chairman of the board of directors of the Regional Plan Association. In June 2017, he was named as a member of the Metropolitan Transportation Authority board. In 2017, Rechler was recognized as the fourth most powerful person in New York City real estate by the Commercial Observer's Power 100 list.

Rechler is also on the board of the 9/11 Memorial, Drum Major Institute and the Feinstein Institute for Medical Research, is a trustee on the board of Long Island Children's Museum, as well as co-chair of the Tribeca Film Institute board of directors and the Centre for Social Innovation board of directors.

Personal life
He is married to his college sweetheart, Debby Feldstein; they have three children: Gabrielle, Elijah, and Tyrone.

References

Date of birth missing (living people)
Living people
American chief executives
American Jews
Businesspeople from New York City
Executives of Metropolitan Transportation Authority (New York)
Port Authority of New York and New Jersey people
Year of birth missing (living people)